Gerald Betts (born 5 October 1954) is a former Australian rules footballer who played with Richmond and Collingwood in the Victorian Football League (VFL) during the 1970s.

A defender from Swan Hill, Betts put together just 10 games in two seasons at Richmond. After a year in the WAFL playing for East Perth, he was signed up by Collingwood for the 1977 season. He played in both the 1977 VFL Grand Final and subsequent Grand Final Replay, as a reserve.

Betts, who now works as a real estate director, returned to Western Australia in 1980 to join Claremont. He was a member of their 1981 premiership team and retired after four seasons.

References

1954 births
Australian rules footballers from Victoria (Australia)
Richmond Football Club players
Collingwood Football Club players
East Perth Football Club players
Claremont Football Club players
Living people